Dysdiadochokinesia (DDK) is the medical term for an impaired ability to perform rapid, alternating movements (i.e., diadochokinesia). Complete inability is called adiadochokinesia. The term is from Greek δυς dys "bad", διάδοχος diadochos "succeeding", κίνησις kinesis "movement".

Signs and symptoms
Abnormalities in diadochokinesia can be seen in the upper extremity, lower extremity and in speech. The deficits become visible in the rate of alternation, the completeness of the sequence, and in the variation in amplitude involving both motor coordination and sequencing. Average rate can be used as a measure of performance when testing for dysdiadochokinesia.

Dysdiadochokinesia is demonstrated clinically by asking the patient to tap the palm of one hand with the fingers of the other, then rapidly turn over the fingers and tap the palm with the back of them, repeatedly. This movement is known as a pronation/supination test of the upper extremity. A simpler method using this same concept is to ask the patient to demonstrate the movement of trying a doorknob or screwing in a light bulb. When testing for this condition in legs, ask the patient to tap your hand as quickly as possible with the ball of each foot in turn. Movements tend to be slow or awkward. The feet normally perform less well than the hands. When testing for dysdiadochokinesia with speech the patient is asked to repeat syllables such as /pə/, /tə/, and /kə/; variation, excess loudness, and irregular articular breakdown are signs of dysdiadochokinesia.

Causes
Dysdiadochokinesia is a feature of cerebellar ataxia and may be the result of lesions to either the cerebellar hemispheres or the frontal lobe (of the cerebrum), it can also be a combination of both. It is thought to be caused by the inability to switch on and switch off antagonising muscle groups in a coordinated fashion due to hypotonia, secondary to the central lesion.

Dysdiadochokinesia is also seen in Friedreich's ataxia and multiple sclerosis, as a cerebellar symptom (including ataxia, intention tremor and dysarthria). It is also a feature of ataxic dysarthria. Dysdiadochokinesia often presents in motor speech disorders (dysarthria), therefore testing for dysdiadochokinesia can be used for a differential diagnosis.

Dysdiadochokinesia has been linked to a mutation in SLC18A2, which encodes vesicular monoamine transporter 2 (VMAT2).

References

External links 

Medical terminology
Symptoms and signs: Nervous system